John Mark Verdier House, also known as Lafayette Building, is a building in Beaufort, South Carolina. It was built by John Mark Verdier, a French Huguenot, in 1804.  The house typified Beaufort's gracious antebellum architectural style.  It was a focal point of the town, a visible statement reflecting Verdier's significant wealth from trading indigo and growing sea island cotton.

It was listed on the National Register of Historic Places in 1971.

It is a contributing property in the Beaufort Historic District, which is a National Historic Landmark.  It is the only house museum in Beaufort and provides tours Monday through Saturday from 10:00 to 4:00.  Admission is $10.00 per person; children and military are free.

The house is owned and operated by the Historic Beaufort Foundation as a historic house museum.

References

External links
Information on John Mark Verdier House Museum
Historic Beaufort Foundation
John Mark Verdier House, Beaufort County (801 Bay St., Beaufort), at South Carolina Department of Archives and History

French-American culture in South Carolina
Huguenot history in the United States
Houses on the National Register of Historic Places in South Carolina
Museums in Beaufort County, South Carolina
Historic house museums in South Carolina
Houses in Beaufort, South Carolina
National Register of Historic Places in Beaufort County, South Carolina